Resin-bound paving is a mixture of aggregate stones and resin used to pave footpaths, driveways, etc. It is a kind of permeable paving solution.

It is a flexible surfacing material, so is resistant to cracking.

The system is mixed on site and cold applied, using a high-quality clear UV resistant resin binder to coat the aggregate particles prior to laying. Unlike resin-bonded surfacing, where a thin layer of resin is applied to the surface and then the aggregate scattered on top (which can then become loose over time and is impermeable), resin and aggregates are thoroughly mixed together prior to laying, ensuring that the aggregate is completely coated and so providing a totally bound surface. As a result, a resin-bound surface is more durable and requires less maintenance – it needs to be swept or power washed at least twice a year, to avoid the build-up of detritus and prevent the growth of moss or algae.

UV resin-bound paving is a fully permeable paving solution which allows water to freely drain through the surface. Meeting the requirements of Sustainable urban drainage systems (SUDS) standards, this helps to prevent standing water and largely eliminates surface water runoff. This also mitigates the need for planning permission when installing a resin driveway as they are permeable..

Resin-bound surfacing conforms to the guidance notes set out by the Resin Flooring Association (FeRFA).  

The quality of the resin-bound surfacing is dependent on a variety of factors.

The UV 2 part polyurethane resin should always be sourced from a manufacturer who can demonstrate that they have BS EN UKAS ISO9001 quality management standards (available information on the FeRFA website). All companies conforming to this will be able to provide documentation on request. The resin-bound aggregate mix will generally be a mix of natural aggregates that must be kiln dried to prevent moisture coming in contact with polyurethanes and causing discolouration and poor performance.

The UV resin sourced should be a two-part, quality-controlled polyurethane or similar with the activator added during the manufacturing process to eradicate mistakes on site made by operatives who are not qualified chemists. Too much activator or too little can affect the performance of the product. The activator has a high risk to health and safety and serious consideration must be given when handling it. 

The ratio of resin to aggregate should be at the optimal amount (7% resin to aggregate) depending on the application and environment type, and stone type which should be kiln dried mixed aggregate incorporating 2-5 mm sizes to ensure that the aggregate gets sufficiently coated and also to meet the standard requirements when tested to BS 8204-6:2008+A1:2010 Appendix B for slip resistance. This ratio is sufficient to install at a minimum depth of 15 mm at a coverage rate of approximately 4.0 m2 and is suitable for pedestrian traffic. For vehicular traffic of up to 7.5 tonnes a minimum of 18 mm is required at a coverage rate of approximately 3.3 m2.

Although resin-bound paving is a slip-resistant, SuDS permeable decorative paving system, it has the ability to last for many years if sourced and installed correctly. It is good practice to source a FeRFA associated member.

Natural aggregate mix blends tested to BS 8204-6:2008+A1:2010 Appendix B for slip resistance will, when installed correctly, provide a slip-resistant, permeable, decorative  finish suitable for pedestrian and light vehicular traffic.

Decorative coloured recycled crushed glass and pigmented quartzes are suitable generally for visual purposes only, as they are susceptible to damage due to having low crush values, and so will become damaged if walked on.

Natural aggregate and recycled rubber blends are available from UKAS ISO9001 manufacturers and are suitable for pathways and nature walks where environmental benefits are required from the specifier. The resins available should be UV resistant polyurethanes.

The usage of higher-quality UV polyurethane resins ensures greater flexural performance for external applications and the resin will not yellow (non UV aromatic) in appearance when exposed to UV light, the presence also provides greater protection from UV degradation. Non light-stable polyurethanes, although marketed as strong in performance, they will rabidly dis-colour and degrade and are only suited to internal applications where they are not in direct sunlight.  Internal resin-bound applications are generally known as stone carpet.

Resin-bound systems incorporating 6-10mm dried aggregates and larger sizes are generally used as tree surrounds known as tree pits. These are a cost-effective and practical alternative to metal tree grilles that are stolen for scrap value, are costly to purchase and harbour litter thus increasing maintenance costs for local authorities and tax payers. Tree pit systems work in a similar way to UV resin-bound surfacing systems only using larger aggregates to allow more water to permeate through to feed the trees they surround.

Tree pit systems are generally installed at a depth of 40 to 50 mm, depending on the specification; they have a reduced ratio of 6% UV light stable polyurethane resin to 100 kg kiln dried aggregate.

Resin bound gravel is particularly sensitive to moisture during the curing process and the presence of water in the mix can cause a reaction in which the polyurethane binder becomes white and bubbles start to form. This issue is quite common but is often due to poor installation practices. Moisture should be completely eliminated from any aggregate used in the mix and the use of kiln-dried sand and gravels is vital to the success and integrity of the surface.

See also
Sustainable urban drainage systems
Bioretention
Bioswale
Impervious surface
Permeability (earth sciences)
Porousity
Road surface
Urban runoff

References

 https://www.ferfa.org.uk/guidance/publications/

External links

https://www.ferfa.org.uk/
The Environment Agency
Scottish Environment Protection Agency
https://www.limegatesolutions.co.uk/
https://www.the-driveway-company.com/resin/

Road infrastructure